The Great Neck Park District is a park district serving much of the Great Neck Peninsula of Nassau County, Long Island, New York, United States. It is the oldest park district in the State of New York and is headquartered a 5 Beach Road, Great Neck, New York 11024.

History 
The Great Neck Park District was established on August 14, 1916, by Great Neck Resident Roswell Eldridge. It was created only a few months after a law was passed by lawmakers in Albany allowing towns to establish park districts; the Great Neck Park District was the first such district of its type to be established anywhere in the State of New York.

In 1942, the Great Neck Park District gave some of its public beach in Kings Point to the United States government for the United States Merchant Marine Academy.

In 1973, the Town of North Hempstead gave approval for the Great Neck Park District to purchase Creek Park through a $270,000 (1973 USD) bond.

In 1977, community parents came together to construct an indoor play facility for children in an abandoned locker room at Steppingstone Park. The equipment installed during the project, which was hand-crafted, painted, and assembled by the locals, included a boat (named the USS Boat) and a rocket ship. Each room was painted by the locals with unique themes and murals related to that theme. The materials cost around $1,800 (1977 USD); parents volunteered with the assembly and painting of the playhouse facilities.

In the 1980s, the beach at Steppingstone Park reopened. It had been closed for over 30 years due to pollution in the Long Island Sound caused by sewage plants operated by the City of New York.

In the 2000s, the Great Neck Park District renovated Parkwood Pool. The renovations included creating a water park.

Service area 
The Great Neck Park District serves the following communities in Great Neck:

Incorporated villages 

 Great Neck
 Great Neck Plaza
 Kensington
 Kings Point
 Russell Gardens
 Thomaston

Unincorporated hamlets 

 Great Neck Gardens
 University Gardens

Additionally, the Great Neck Park District serves the area of Spinney Hill in Manhasset zoned for the Great Neck Union Free School District.

List of parks 
The Great Neck Park District operates the following parks and recreational facilities:

Major parks 

 Allenwood Park
 Kings Point Park
 Memorial Field
 Parkwood Pool & Sports Complex
 Steppingstone Park & Marina
 Village Green & Rose Garden

Neighborhood parks 

 Cutter Mill Park 
 Firefighters Park
 Lakeville Park
 Manor Park
 Ravine Park
 Thomaston Park
 Upland Park
 Wyngate Park

Passive parks 

 Creek Park (Daniel Jay Berg Memorial Park)
 Udalls Pond Park 
 Woodland Preserve
 Wooleys Lane Park

Dog park 
The Great Neck Park District operates a dog park on Colonial Road.

Great Neck House 
Additionally, the Great Neck Parks District operates the Great Neck House. This facility serves as a cultural venue, and often provides park district residents with activities such as movies and live performances.

List of parking fields 
The Great Neck Park District operates the following commuter parking fields:

 Canterbury Road Lot
 North Station Plaza Lot
 Shoreward Drive

See also
 Manhasset Park District – Another park district on Long Island, in the adjacent area of Manhasset.

References 

Great Neck Peninsula
Town of North Hempstead, New York
Special districts in Nassau County, New York
Park districts in New York (state)